The Wright's Ferry Bridge carries U.S. Route 30 (US 30) over the Susquehanna River between Columbia and Wrightsville, Pennsylvania. The "Wright's Ferry" in its name commemorates the first ferry across the Susquehanna River. The bridge is considered the fifth Columbia–Wrightsville Bridge; it complements the fourth one, which still carries Lincoln Highway traffic.

Also known informally and locally as the Route 30 bridge, it was commissioned by the Commonwealth of Pennsylvania in the 1960s to relocate US 30 and bypass the river towns of Wrightsville and Columbia. Construction started in March 1969 with G.A. & F.C. Wagman, Inc. as the general contractor.

The bridge was completed in 1972 at a cost of $12 million and opened November 21, 1972 under its present commemorative historical name, with Wright's Ferry being both the historic ferry's and one of Columbia's former names. It is constructed of reinforced concrete and steel and has 46 equal sections on 45 piers. US 30 crosses it as a divided four-lane roadway. About a year after its opening, the bridge was shut down briefly so that an experimental weather-resistant coating could be applied to its roadway. Tolls were never collected on this bridge, the sixth to have crossed the river in this general location.

See also
 List of crossings of the Susquehanna River

References
 Columbia, the Gem, Bill Kloidt, Sr. 1994, Mifflin Press, Inc.

Notes

External links
 http://www.rivertownes.org/Features/Crossings/Crossings.htm
 http://www.rivertownes.org/townes.htm

Bridges over the Susquehanna River
U.S. Route 30
Bridges completed in 1972
Bridges in Lancaster County, Pennsylvania
Bridges in York County, Pennsylvania
Road bridges in Pennsylvania
Bridges of the United States Numbered Highway System
Steel bridges in the United States